The Nikon 1 series is a discontinued camera line from Nikon, originally announced on 21 September 2011. The cameras utilized Nikon 1-mount lenses, and featured 1" CX format sensors.

The series included the Nikon 1 V1, J1, J2, and S1 with a 10-megapixel image sensor, the V2, J3, S2 and AW1 with a 14-megapixel image sensor and further increased autofocus speed to 15 frames per second (fps), and the 1 V3, J4 with a new 18-megapixel image sensor, further increased autofocus speed to 20 fps, 120 fps HD slow-motion at 1280 x 720 and 1080/60p.  The J5 model added a 20.8MP sensor in 2015 and kept most other technical specifications the same as the J4 model.

At the time of announcement, Nikon claimed that the cameras featured the world's fastest autofocus, with 10 fps—even during videos—based on hybrid autofocus (phase detection/contrast-detect AF with AF-assist illuminator), as well as the world's fastest continuous shooting speed (60 fps) among all cameras with interchangeable lenses. Slow-motion movies can be captured in up to 1200 fps with reduced resolution. Its inbuilt intervalometer enables time-lapse photography.

Nikon discontinued the Nikon 1 series in July 2018. Its successor, the -series, launched later that year, with the Nikon Z7 and Nikon Z6 being the first two models.

New technologies
 Nikon CX format with 2.7 times crop factor. Although the image sensor area of 13.2 x 8.8mm is about half of the Micro Four Thirds system and a quarter of the Nikon DX format, it delivers a good performance for this small size, comparable to older Four-Thirds sensors like Olympus E-5, Olympus PEN E-P3, Panasonic Lumix DMC-G3 or older DSLRs like Nikon D40. The smaller sensor considerably increases the depth of field compared to a 35mm FX camera at the same angle of view and f-number.
 CMOS image sensor with integrated 73 phase detection sensors providing hybrid autofocus with both phase detection and 135-point contrast detect AF delivering what Nikon claimed to be fastest commercially available autofocus.

 Nikon 1-mount and F-mount adapter FT1 enabling the use of all F-mount lenses especially with integrated autofocus motor. The FT1 adapter mounts and meters with all AI-P, AF, AF-S, D and G lenses and compatibles providing autofocus with all lenses with integrated autofocus motor. It further mounts Pre-AI, AI, AI-S and E lenses without metering as well as lenses which jut out the F-mount (needing mirror lock-up on cameras with mirror). Although not recommended, it is used with teleconverters for extreme telephotos.
 Lenses featuring Rear Focusing (RF) system with reduced moving masses and world's fastest extremely quiet Voice Coil motors (VCM) or Stepping (STM) motors to speed-up autofocus.
 3-Speed silent Power-Drive motor zoom in the Nikkor VR 10-100mm f/4.5-5.6 PD-Zoom optimized for shooting HD movies.
 Nikon 1 Nikkor VR 10-100mm f/4.5-5.6 PD-Zoom integrates a high amount of technologies: High number of 21 elements including 1 High Refractive Index (HRI, >2), 3 Extra-low Dispersion (ED) and 2 aspherical lenses, Super Integrated Coating (SIC), internal focusing (IF) with world's fastest quiet Voice Coil motor, 3-speed silent PD-Zoom, Vibration Reduction (VR II), retractable lens mechanism and 7 rounded diaphragm blades. Together with the Canon EF 28-300mm lens it is the only current superzoom with 20 elements or more.
 Fast electronic shutter (1/16 000) or additional electronically controlled mechanical focal-plane shutter.
 The V1 incorporates a 'multi accessory port' currently used for dedicated 1 Series flash and GPS units as well as AS-N1000 cold shoe adapter for mounting the ME-1 stereo microphone.
 High-speed dual multi-core image-processing pipelines with 600 megapixels per second speed: Expeed 3.
 Smart Photo Selector Mode enables selection of the best candidates out of a high-speed sequence.
 Advanced High-definition video recording allows uninterrupted filming while capturing high-resolution photos.
 Firmware updates of the Nikon 1 lenses are possible.

Other technologies
 As all Nikon DSLRs with CMOS sensor it integrates an active D-Lighting system, automatic correction of lateral chromatic aberration and vignetting.
 Autofocus modes include 3D subject-tracking, 41 points auto-area, manual focus and others.
 Inbuilt time-lapse photography intervalometer

Lens system 

Nikon developed an entirely new system of lenses and the Nikon 1-mount lens mount for the Nikon 1 series. These lenses are only compatible with 1-mount cameras. Nikon has not debuted a new lens mount since the F mount that routine users of the Nikon D series are accustomed to. Although the F-mount adapter FT1 enables the use of all F-mount compatible lenses, these lenses are meant to be portable and compact. There are 13 Nikkor lenses specifically built to fit the Nikon 1-mount in addition to several manual focus lenses from Samyang.

 1 Nikkor 10mm 2.8
 1 Nikkor AW 10mm 2.8
 1 Nikkor 18.5mm 1.8
 1 Nikkor 32mm 1.2
 1 Nikkor VR 6.7-13mm 3.5-5.6 
 1 Nikkor VR 10-30mm 3.5-5.6
 1 Nikkor VR 10-30mm 3.5-5.6 PD-Zoom
 1 Nikkor VR 10-100mm 4.5-5.6 PD-Zoom
 1 Nikkor VR 10-100mm f/4.0-5.6
 1 Nikkor 11–27.5mm 3.5-5.6
 1 Nikkor VR 30-110mm 3.8-5.6
 1 Nikkor VR 70-300mm 4.5-5.6

Notes

Optional accessories
In addition to the already available lenses, flash, cases, GPS unit etc. Nikon presented at PDN PhotoPlus International Conference + Expo 2011 many forthcoming lenses, LED video and macro lights and video kits. With the 1 series cameras having a non-standard hot shoe, the SB-N5 flashgun, which drew power from the camera itself, was made available. Every lens shown at the 2011 PDN PhotoPlus trade show but the macro lens of unknown focal length were eventually released before the system was discontinued.

Reception
Independent reviews and image comparisons at all ISO speeds in JPEG and additionally Raw are available. Both of the initially released 1 series cameras were criticized for having DSLR-like prices. DxO Labs awarded the J1 sensor an overall score of 56.

See also
 Nikon 1-mount
 List of Nikon F-mount lenses with integrated autofocus motors
 Comparison of Nikon 1 cameras

References

External links

 Nikon 1 Lineup Brochure Nikon (PDF)
 Advanced Camera with Interchangeable Lens Nikon
 Nikon 1 NIKKOR lenses & Nikon 1 accessories
 Nikon 1 Camera Accessories

Live-preview digital cameras
1
Cameras introduced in 2011